The Guianan white-eared opossum (Didelphis imperfecta) is an opossum species from South America. It is found in Brazil, Suriname, French Guiana and Venezuela. 

Possessing the smallest distribution area of its genus, this species is endemic to the Guiana Shield and can inhabit elevations ranging from 80 to 2,250 meters above sea level in the region's lowland forests.

This species, together with the Andean white-eared opossum (D. pernigra), was separated from the white-eared opossum (D. albiventris) in 2002, having been included with that species in 1993.

References 

Opossums
Mammals of Brazil
Mammals of French Guiana
Mammals of Guyana
Mammals of Suriname
Mammals of Venezuela
Mammals described in 1984